John Coburn may refer to:

 John Coburn (painter) (1925–2006), Australian painter
 John Coburn (politician) (1825–1908), Civil War general and Congressman
 John Coburn (silversmith) (1724–1803), silversmith in Boston, Massachusetts
 John Bowen Coburn (1914–2009), bishop of the Episcopal Diocese of Massachusetts
 John G. Coburn (born 1941), U.S. Army general
 John P. Coburn (1811–1873), Boston African-American abolitionist

See also
 John Cockburn (disambiguation)